Karoor Kavu is a small village, situated in Ernakulam District, Kerala, India. The original name is "Karoor" and there is temple in the village so normally people calling "Karoor Kavu". "Kavu" stands for temple.

References 

Villages in Ernakulam district